The community of Serbian Canadians includes Canadian citizens of Serb ethnicity, or people born in Serbia who permanently reside in Canada. Serbs (and Serbians) have migrated to Canada in various waves during the 20th century. Today there are five or more generations of Serbs in the country. The 2016 census recorded 96,530 people in Canada declaring themselves as "Serbian". Serbian Canadians generally belong to the Serbian Orthodox Church and follow the Eastern Orthodox tradition.

History
The first Serbs to arrive in Canada came to British Columbia in the 1850s. Many of them came from the state of California in the United States, while others directly emigrated from the Balkans. They primarily originated from the Bay of Kotor and the Dalmatian coast which had similar climates as their destinations. A second wave of Serb emigration occurred from 1900 to 1914. In both instances, the majority of these migrants came from territories controlled by Austria-Hungary for political and economic reasons, and only a small number came directly from Independent Serbia.

Those who settled were typically young single men and employed in mining or forestry near such towns as Phoenix, Golden Prince Rupert and Kamloops. Fishing and the search for gold were also among the primary occupations of these early settlers. In the Yukon, Black Mike Winage arrived from Serbia in 1898 near the end of the Klondike Gold Rush and became a pioneer.

During the second wave of emigration, Serbs arrived in the prairies. In Saskatchewan, they took up farming. In Alberta, coal mining and road construction was a source of employment. Many Serbs worked on the construction of railway lines that now extend from Edmonton to the Pacific coast. Communities of Serbs emerged in Regina, Lethbridge, Edmonton and Calgary while significant populations formed in Atlin, British Columbia and Dawson, Yukon. In Ontario and Quebec, Serbs were drawn to work in the industry sector. By 1914, the Serbian community of the city of Hamilton, Ontario numbered around 1,000. Further Serb settlement was established in Niagara Falls, London, and Windsor. The first Serbian immigrants to the city of Toronto arrived in 1903; by 1914 there were more than 200 Serbs.

During the Great War, military-aged Serb males who hailed from Serbia or Montenegro were considered allies but those who were born in Austro-Hungarian territories were deemed enemy aliens by Canadian law, even though their sympathies tended to lie with the allied cause. The latter were restricted in their freedom of movements, had to wear special identity cards and had to identify themselves regularly at the police station. Several hundred were interned in prison camps throughout the country under terrible conditions. Physicist Mihajlo Pupin, Serbia's consul in New York during the war, and Antun Seferović, the honorary consul of Serbia in Montreal, advocated for the rights of the classified aliens and internees through diplomacy via the Srpska Narodna Odbrana u Kanadi (Serbian National League of Canada) which resulted in exemption, compensation and the release of many ethnic Serbs. Another advocate for the rights of Serbs of Austro-Hungarian origin was Serbian-born court interpreter Bud Protich, who enlisted in the Canadian Army and was wounded in action in 1917.

Prior to World War I, many arriving Serbs were variously categorized under related Balkan groups, making the exact number of Serb immigrants difficult to determine. After 1921, all immigrants from Yugoslavia, including Serbs, were designated as "Yugoslavs". The interwar period saw a major increase in Serbian immigration to Canada. More than 30,000 Yugoslavs came to Canada between 1919 and 1939, including an estimated 10,000 Serbs. Many of these immigrants were single, working men who settled in the northern region of the province of Ontario. During this time, ties to Europe were strong and pressure from Belgrade and Ottawa resulted in certain Serbian Canadian newspapers being banned due to their communist ideas. They were mostly written by pro-Russian Yugoslavs who were not necessarily of Serbian origin.

After the Second World War, Serbian political émigrés who were opposed to the newly established Yugoslav communist government sought refuge in Canada. Many of these were POWs and laborers from Austria and Germany who refused to return to their homeland. They settled in cities such as Toronto, Sudbury and Hamilton. Between 1957 and 1971, some 23,000 Yugoslavs arrived in Canada, of whom 10-15% were Serbs. They established organizations, newspapers and cultural events.

In the late 1980s, Yugoslavia's communist government was on the verge of collapse. Shortly after the breakup of Yugoslavia in 1991, a large group of Serbs moved to Canada, mostly to Southern Ontario. This was a major brain drain, with educated Serbs fleeing serious economic problems and an undemocratic government. Other Serbs who came during the 1990s were refugees who fled the various civil wars in Yugoslavia.

Serbian Canadians protested the NATO bombing of Yugoslavia which lasted from March 24 to June 10, 1999.

Demographics
Officially there were 96,530 people in Canada who identified themselves as wholly or partly "Serbian" in the 2016 Census. However, this number may be much higher as there are some 38,480 people who identify as Yugoslavs in Canada, many of whom may be Serbs. The major centre of Serbian settlement in Canada is Toronto, which is home to 19,375 Serbs in the city proper and 33,055 in the CMA. Other Serbian strongholds include London, Kitchener, Oakville, and Regina. Niagara Falls has the highest per capita Serbian population of any Canadian city.

Religion
As adherents of the Eastern Orthodox faith, the vast majority of Canadian Serbs belong to the Serbian Orthodox Church. The first Serbian Orthodox Church built in Canada was the Holy Trinity Serbian Orthodox Church in Regina, Saskatchewan in 1916. The first Parish committee was formed in 1913 in Hamilton and dedicated to St. Nicholas.

The Serbian Orthodox Diocese in the United States and Canada was established in 1921. In 1963, it was reorganized into three sections and in 1983, a fourth was created specifically for the Canadian churches.

Culture

In 1954 the Serb Youth Club in Toronto was formed, and its folk-dance group Stražilovo became one of the first highly successful dance groups in Canada.

Toronto's folk-dance group Hajduk Veljko (founded in 1964) danced at the Montreal Olympics in 1976 and at Expo '86 in Vancouver, and Toronto's Oplenac (1973).

From the early 1950s to 1984 the Serbian Cultural Club St Sava was active in Toronto, publishing eight volumes in Serbian dealing with Serb history.

In 1968, the Saint Michael the Archangel Serbian Orthodox Church hosted the "Belgrade" pavilion of the Toronto Caravan cultural festival, organized by the late Colette Sekulovich (née Leroy) which displayed many Serbian cultural artifacts, showcased Kolo dancing and other performance arts, and gave the people of Toronto a chance to taste Serbian delicacies. The annual festival ran for over 30 years, winning, in 2001, the Zena Kossar "Best Pavilion Award".

The Serbian Heritage Academy of Canada, initiated, founded, and spearheaded by Sofija Skoric in Toronto in 1981, has organized academic conferences, exhibits, and lectures. In 1984 it installed a bronze plaque at the University of Toronto's Medical Sciences Building honouring Canadian doctors and nurses who had worked as volunteers in Serbia during World War I.

The Serbian Cultural Association Oplenac was founded in 1987 in Mississauga, Ontario, Canada. Serbian folk dancing has been a major activity in SCA Oplenac since its inception as a non-profit organization. All proceeds from its events go to the preservation and presentation of Serbian culture and tradition in North America. In 2012 the company consisted of 8 large ensembles, a choir, an orchestra as well as a large recreational ensemble. They established a drama school for children that performs theatre plays in Serbian, as well as a Serbian-language school. Since 2000 it has been clear that the association is undoubtedly the biggest Serbian folklore group in North America.

Serbian Theatre Toronto was established in 2004 and is the oldest Serbian theatre in Canada and North America. In more than ten years of activity, the theatre has produced more than twenty plays by Serbian writers. The group has more than 20 members but has had three times as many in the past. Serbian Theatre Toronto has performed in many cities in Canada and the USA.

The first Serb bookstore, Serbica Books, was opened in 1990 by Živko Apić and was located at 2465 Dundas Street West in Toronto.

Established in 2008, Toronto's Puls teatar (Pulse Theatre) is the biggest drama club and theatre for children in Serbian in Canada.

Serbian Toronto Television is a weekly 30-minute current affairs Serbian television show that is filmed throughout various locations across Canada and Serbia and airs on multicultural channel Omni Television.

Serbian Monuments in Canada
In 1991, a non-profit senior citizens apartment building in Windsor, Ontario, was named General Mihailovich Place in commemoration of saving the lives of hundreds of MIA airmen (including Canadians) who were forced to parachute after their bombers sustained damage from Nazi groundfire over Serbia, Yugoslavia.

On October 26, 2004, at an unveiling by Toronto City Councillors Joe Mihevc and Howard Moscoe, a street in Toronto was renamed Beograd Gardens to honour Serbia's capital city Belgrade. The street is located north of Eglinton Avenue and west of Marlee Avenue.

Mount Putnik in Peter Lougheed Provincial Park in Alberta, was named after the World War I Serbian General Radomir Putnik. In June 2012, the Ravna Gora Serbian Heritage Society of Calgary unveiled a plaque to commemorate him on the mountain.

In 2016, a boulevard in Hamilton was named after Nikola Tesla.

Media
 Newspapers
 Novine Toronto
 Vesti
 TV
 Serbian Television Toronto
 Serbian Toronto Television (SerbianTorontoTV)

Notable people

See also

 Serbian Orthodox Eparchy of Canada
 Serbian Heritage Museum
 Serbian White Eagles FC
 Serbian Americans
 Serbs in South America

References

Sources

Further reading
 Community Life and Culture From: The Encyclopedia of Canada's Peoples/Serbs/Paul Pavlovich

 
 
Serbian
Serb diaspora
Serbian Orthodox Church in Canada